Craig L. Blomberg (born August 3, 1955) is an American New Testament scholar. He is currently the Distinguished Professor Emeritus of the New Testament at Denver Seminary in Colorado where he has been since 1986. His area of academic expertise is the New Testament. This includes parables, miracles, historical Jesus, Luke-Acts, John, 1 Corinthians, James, the historical trustworthiness of Scripture, financial stewardship, gender roles, Latter Day Saint movement, hermeneutics, New Testament theology, and exegetical method. Blomberg has written and edited multiple books. He is married to Frances Fulling Blomberg and has two grown daughters, Elizabeth Little and Rachel Blomberg.

Education
His Ph.D. is from the University of Aberdeen, Scotland; his M.A. from Trinity Evangelical Divinity School in Deerfield, IL; and his B.A. from Augustana College in Rock Island, IL., which is also his hometown.

Career
Throughout his career he has taught and guest lectured widely on six continents. He is a member of the Evangelical Theological Society, the Tyndale Fellowship, the Institute for Biblical Research, the Society of Biblical Literature, the Studiorum Novi Testamenti Societas, and the Committee on Bible Translation for the New International Version of the Scriptures. Prior to being hired at Denver Seminary he was a research fellow at Tyndale House Cambridge and an Assistant Professor of Religion at Palm Beach Atlantic College in West Palm Beach, Florida.

Personal life 
Blomberg was born in a mainline Protestant family and was a member of the Lutheran Church in America.

While he was in high school, he joined the Youth for Christ and became a born again Evangelical; he is currently a member of the Evangelical Covenant Church.

Works

Books
 , 2nd ed. 2007
 , 2nd ed. 2012
 
 , 2nd ed. Nashville: Nelson, 2004; 3rd ed. Grand Rapids: Zondervan, 2017
 
 , 2nd ed. 2009, 3rd ed. 2022.
 
 
 
 
 
 
 , 2nd ed. 2021
 
 
 
 
 
 
 
 
 _ (2020). Can We Still Believe in God? Answering Ten Contemporary Challenges to Christianity. Grand Rapids: Brazos.

as Editor
 
 , 2nd ed. 2005

Articles & Chapters
 Blomberg has published more than 150 peer-reviewed articles and chapters in multi-author works, including dictionaries and encyclopedias.

References

External links 
 Denver Seminary
 A video interview with Craig Blomberg on why he is an Evangelical on Patheos
 Craig Blomberg (Theopedia)
 TNIV: The Untold Story of a Good Translation by Craig Blomberg
 Dr. Craig Blomberg on the Bones of Jesus Controversy
An Interview with Craig Blomberg

1955 births
Living people
American theologians
American biblical scholars
Evangelical writers
Critics of the Christ myth theory
People from the Denver metropolitan area
Trinity Evangelical Divinity School alumni
Augustana College (Illinois) alumni
Alumni of the University of Aberdeen
Palm Beach Atlantic University faculty
New Testament scholars
21st-century evangelicals